The 2011 Baltimore Grand Prix refers to two motorsport events that have happened on the same weekend at the street circuit in Baltimore, Maryland:

 2011 Baltimore Grand Prix (IndyCar), an Indy Car Series race
 2011 Baltimore Grand Prix (ALMS), an American Le Mans Series race